The Te Waka Toi awards are the premier awards in the field of ngā toi Māori (Māori arts). They have been awarded by Creative New Zealand and predecessors since 1986. The awards recognise tohunga (skilled people), artists and community leaders across all arts forms including visual and performing arts.

There are seven awards, including:
 Te Tohu mō Te Arikinui Dame Te Atairangikaahu (Exemplary/Supreme Award)
 Ngā Tohu ā Tā Kingi Ihaka (Sir Kingi Ihaka Award), which recognises the recipient's lifetime contribution to Māori arts
 Te Tohu Toi Kē a Te Waka Toi (Making a Difference Award)

Te Tohu mō Te Arikinui Dame Te Atairangikaahu
Winners of Te Tohu mō Te Arikinui Dame Te Atairangikaahu, the exemplary / supreme award in 'recognition of leadership, excellence and outstanding contribution to Ngā Toi Māori' are listed in the following table.

Ngā Tohu ā Tā Kingi Ihaka (Sir Kingi Ihaka Award)
The Sir Kingi Ihaka award is for kaumātua in 'recognition of their contribution to strengthening the continuity of Māori culture through their support of ngā Toi Māori'. Laureates since 2019 are listed in the following table .

References

1986 establishments in New Zealand
New Zealand art awards
Māori art
New Zealand theatre awards